Boyce G. Clayton (October 22, 1929 – March 15, 2020) was a justice of the Kentucky's top courts from 1975 to 1983, serving on the Kentucky Court of Appeals from 1975 to 1976, and on the newly-created Kentucky Supreme Court from 1976 to 1983.

Early life, education, and career
Born in Birmingham, Alabama, he attended Benton High School and served in the United States Army after World War II. He graduated from Murray State University and briefly taught in Metropolis, Illinois, and then at Waggerner High School, in Kentucky, while pursuing his J.D. at the University of Louisville School of Law. He gained admission to the bar in Kentucky in 1960, and became Prosecuting Attorney for the city of Mayfield, Kentucky. In October 1972 he was initiated into the Benevolent and Protective Order of Elks with 11 others. In 1968, he was elected as the Commonwealth's Attorney for the 42d District. He was a Democrat.

Judicial Service
In 1974, Clayton defeated incumbent Justice Earl T. Osborne in the Democratic primary for a seat on the Kentucky Court of Appeals, which was the highest court in Kentucly at the time. He took office on January 6, 1975. On January 1, 1976, Clayton and the six other Justices of the Court of Appeals were automatically elevated to the newly formed Kentucky Supreme Court. In 1982, he lost the position to Roy N. Vance in the nonpartisan general election, and left office on January 3, 1983.

He then ran to re-join the appellate court in November 1983 but lost to B. R. "Bill" Paxton. He successfully re-joined the Kentucky Court of Appeals and had 16 years of judicial service by 1991. After concluding his judicial service, he was the City Attorney for Benton, Kentucky for four years, until he retired from practice.

Personal life and death
Clayton's wife died before him, and he was survived by two daughters.

He died at Oakview Manor Healthcare Center in Calvert City, Kentucky, at the age of 90.

Electoral history

References

1929 births
2020 deaths
People from Birmingham, Alabama
Murray State University alumni
University of Louisville School of Law alumni
Justices of the Kentucky Supreme Court